Nicolai Dunger (born Claus Wilhelm Nicolai Dunger; 4 February 1968) is a Swedish singer and acoustic songwriter from Piteå in Sweden. He has released twelve EPs and albums, singing primarily in English, and collaborated notably with Will Oldham, the Esbjörn Svensson jazz trio and Ebbot Lundberg. He also records under the alias A Taste of Ra as well as his birth name.

Biography
A Swedish-born singer who falls under blues, folk, jazz, soul music. A former association football player, Nicolai was signed by the Telegram label of Warner records, releasing two albums that did not sell enough copies to enable him to give up his part-time job as a gardener.

A meeting with Ebbot Lundberg of the Swedish band The Soundtrack of Our Lives led to two further albums, a tour with Emilíana Torrini and the use of one of his songs in an advertisement for an oil company. This small influx of cash enabled the production of a trio of vinyl albums with the Esbjörn Svensson jazz trio.

This steady production of somewhat experimental acoustic music attracted the attention of Americana luminaries Will Oldham and Jonathan Donahue, and a contract with the Dolores Recordings branch of Virgin Records followed. The first album on this label, Soul Rush, with backing from the Esbjörn Svensson trio, attracted some limited attention in 2001, but the next album, 2002's Tranquil Isolation, achieved widespread attention, especially thanks to its input from Will Oldham.

A third album, Here's My Song, You Can Have It, followed in 2004. He has featured on both Nina Persson's second "A Camp" record, and on Maia Hirasawa's album GBG vs STHLM.

Discography
 1996   Songs Wearing Clothes   	      	  	  	
 1997   Eventide	
 1999   This Cloud Is Learning
 2000   Blind Blemished Blues
 2001   A Dress Book
 2001   Soul Rush
 2002   Sweat Her Kiss
 2002   The Vinyl Trilogy
 2003   Tranquil Isolation
 2004   Here's My Song, You Can Have It...I Don't Want it Anymore
 2006   Sjunger Edith Södergran
 2007   Rösten Och Herren 2008   Nicollide and the Carmic Retribution 2009   Play 2010   Original Motion Picture Soundtrack - Vallmo (duo album with Jonas Kullhammar, released on vinyl only in 300 copies)
 2011   Ballad of This Land 2022   Every Line Runs Together''

Trivia
Nicolai's song "Something in the Way" was featured in a Volvo commercial in the U.S. in July 2008

Nicolai's song "Dr Zhivago's Train" was recorded by Robert Palmer on his album "Drive"

External links
 Official website
 Short biography
 Review of Tranquil Isolation at Pitchfork Media

Living people
People from Piteå
Swedish alternative country singers
1969 births
Zoë Records artists